Our Time was released by folk music duo The Gordons on March 19, 2008. It was recorded and engineered, mixed, and mastered by Gary Gordon at Inside-Out Studio in Sparta, Illinois.

Track listing
"I Can't Settle Down" (Roberta Gordon, Tim Carter) - 2:48 
"300 Miles from Hazard" (Si Kahn) - 3:10
"Rock-a-Bye Cindy" (R, Gordon, Gary Gordon) - 3:09
"Blackjack Davey" (Traditional; arr. and adapt. by R. Gordon, G. Gordon) - 4:52 
"All My Tears" (Julie Miller) - 3:43
"Widow Mae" (R. Gordon, G. Gordon) - 2:56 
"When I Get Over You" (Randy Leiner) - 3:02 
"Give Me Water, Lord" (R. Gordon, G. Gordon) - 1:19 
"Lincoln's Funeral Train" (Norman Blake)  - 4:01
"Thank You For Reminding Me" (R. Gordon, G. Gordon) - 2:50 
"Shady Grove" (Traditional; arr. and adapt. by R. Gordon, G. Gordon) - 4:24 
"Randall Collins" (Norman Blake) - 3:05 
"A Child's Song" (R. Gordon, G. Gordon) - 2:33
"After All This Time" (R. Gordon, G. Gordon) - 3:11

Personnel

The Gordons
Gary Gordon – vocals, guitar, Dobro
Roberta Gordon – vocals, autoharp

Additional personnel
Robert Bowlin – fiddle, mandolin, guitar
Tim Carter – banjo
Noah Gordon – vocals
David Johnson – fiddle
Bruce Molsky – banjo, fiddle
Ross Sermons – upright bass
Mark Stoffel – mandolin, fiddle

2008 albums
The Gordons (duo) albums
Randolph County, Illinois